Run Devil Run may refer to:

Music

Albums
Run Devil Run (album), a 1999 album by Paul McCartney
Run Devil Run, a 1996 album by Los Furios
Oh! (Girls' Generation album), a 2010 album re-released as Run Devil Run

Songs
"Run Devil Run" (Girls' Generation song), 2010
"Run Devil Run" (Paul McCartney song), 1999
"Run Devil Run", a 1996 song by Los Furios
"Run Devil Run", a 2006 song by Jenny Lewis and the Watson Twins from Rabbit Fur Coat
"Run Devil Run", a 2016 song by Crowder

Other uses
Run Devil Run oil, Mexican folk remedy